is a Japanese chemist specializing in nanotechnology and self-assembly. He was educated at the Tokyo Institute of Technology, where he defended his PhD in 1990 and later worked as assistant professor. Since 2004 he carries out research at the National Institute for Materials Science, and teaches at the University of Tokyo, where he is a full professor. Ariga is a Fellow of the Royal Society of Chemistry (2013) and an editor of the journal Science and Technology of Advanced Materials.

Selected publications
According to the Web of Science Ariga published five articles with more than 700 citations each:

References

External links

 Brief Conversations with Katsuhiko Ariga on YouTube: 
 What is nanoarchitectonics? 
 What makes a good paper? 
 Direction of nanoscience in the coming years 
 What do you find exciting in materials science research?

1962 births
Fellows of the Royal Society of Chemistry
Japanese chemists
Living people
Tokyo Institute of Technology alumni
Academic staff of Tokyo Institute of Technology
Academic staff of the University of Tokyo